Platyrrhinus ismaeli is a species of bat found in South America.

Taxonomy and etymology
It was described as a new species in 2005 by zoologist Paul Velazco. Its description was the result of a taxonomic split in Thomas's broad-nosed bat, P. dorsalis. The holotype was collected in May 1987 near Balsas District, Peru. Phylogenetically, it belongs to the "Andean" clade of its genus.
Other members of this clade are P. albericoi, P. aurarius, P. chocoensis, P. dorsalis, P. infuscus, P. masu, P. nigellus,  and P. vittatus. P. masu is the sister taxa of P. ismaeli, or its closest relative.

The eponym of the species name is Ismael Ceballos Bendezú, a Peruvian mammalogist. Velazco named the species after him "in recognition of his important contributions to the study of Peruvian bats."

Description
The fur on its back is dark brown, and its ventral fur is grayish. It has dark facial stripes of differing sizes. It has a stripe running down the length of its spine that is lighter than its facial stripes. Its nose-leaf is longer than it is wide. Males and females are similar in appearance.

Biology
Little is known about its reproduction. A pregnant female was once documented in late January, while another female with more advanced pregnancy was documented in early March.
It is "basically frugivorous".

Range and habitat
It has been documented on both sides of the Andes in Peru, Ecuador, and Colombia. It is often found in montane forests.

Conservation
It is currently evaluated as near-threatened by the IUCN. Its most recent assessment in 2016 was a down-listing from its 2008 assessment as vulnerable.

References

External links
An image of this species is on page one

Mammals described in 2005
Bats of South America
Mammals of Colombia
Mammals of Ecuador
Mammals of Peru
Platyrrhinus